Powder-douce (also poudre-douce, literally "sweet powder," ) is a spice mix used in Medieval and Renaissance cookery. Like modern spice mixes such as "Italian seasoning," "garam masala," "taco seasoning," etc., there was not a set ingredient list, it varied from cook to cook. The author of the 14th-century manuscript Le Ménagier de Paris suggested a mix of grains of paradise, ginger, cinnamon, nutmeg, sugar, and galangal.

The 16th-century Catalan cookbook Libre del Coch gives two recipes for polvora de duch: The first is made with ginger, cinnamon, cloves and sugar, all finely chopped and sifted with a cedaç (a fine sieve made of horsehair), while the second adds galangal and long pepper.

There is a related mixed spice called powder-forte, literally "strong powder".

References

Medieval cuisine
Herb and spice mixtures
Douce